Juan Ting-fei (born 28 August 1992) is a former Taiwanese tennis player.

She has career-high WTA rankings of 455 in singles, achieved on 21 May 2012, and 580 in doubles, reached on 29 April 2013. Juan won two singles titles and two doubles titles on tournaments of the ITF Circuit.

Playing for Chinese Taipei Fed Cup team, Juan has a win–loss record of 1–7.

ITF finals

Singles: 2 (2–0)

Doubles: 8 (2–6)

External links
 
 
 

1992 births
Living people
Taiwanese female tennis players
21st-century Taiwanese women